The Art & History Museum is a public museum of antiquities and ethnographic and decorative arts located at the Parc du Cinquantenaire/Jubelpark in Brussels, Belgium. The museum is one of the constituent parts of the Royal Museums of Art and History (RMAH) and is one of the largest art museums in Europe. It was formerly called the Cinquantenaire Museum until 2018. It is served by the metro stations Schuman and Merode on lines 1 and 5.

History
The museum's first collections were assembled during the reigns of the Dukes of Burgundy and subsequently the Habsburg archdukes, and were placed in various locations in Brussels, their capital. By 1889, the gate had become too small and the collections were relocated to the Parc du Cinquantenaire/Jubelpark (except for the armour and weapons which still remain in the gate). The Cinquantenaire was an army parade ground until the 1880 National Exhibition when the large iron, glass and steel Cinquantenaire Palace was built with a military museum in the north wing.

During the interwar period, the collections grew considerably due to Belgian scientific expeditions around the world most notably in Apamea (Syria), in Egypt by the Egyptologist Jean Capart, and in Easter Island in 1936, or by excavations in archaeological sites across Belgium. Many wealthy Belgians also donated artworks to the museum. In the mid-20th century, a new wing was built in the west of the building to house the classical antiquity collections.

The museum was called the Cinquantenaire Museum until 2018, when it was renamed the Art & History Museum.

Collection 
The Art & History Museum's collections are divided into four parts:
 National archaeology
 Classical antiquity
 Non-European civilisations
 European decorative arts

National archaeology
The museum has a large collection of national archaeological pieces dating from prehistory, the Gallo-Roman period, to the Merovingian period.

Prehistory
The Prehistory room presents the vestiges of cultures and civilisations attested in what is now Belgium from the Paleolithic to the Iron Age. Tools, vases and jewellery are put back into context thanks to models and reconstructions which allow visitors to get an idea of the evolution of daily life during those different periods.

Gallo-Roman Belgium
The conquest of Gaul by Caesar marked the beginning of a new era for Belgium. The development of craftsmanship is confirmed by the richness and diversity of artefacts dating from that period: ceramic dishes, fibulae, bronze figurines, as well as glass, bronze and silver containers, the most refined examples of which come from rich funerary furniture. The reconstructions of a Roman villa facade, a heating system, and even a painted wall decor, embody the Gallo-Roman culture.

Merovingian civilisation

The Merovingian civilisation is known to us mainly through the worship of the dead. In this context, eight tombs are reconstructed in the room presenting this period. Furniture from other graves is distributed in themed display cases where visitors can admire jewellery, belt buckles and other fibulae.

Classical antiquity
The museum's collection houses early art from the ancient Middle-Eastern, Egyptian, Greek and Roman civilisations.

Middle East
The Middle East, one of the cradles of civilisation, is presented through reliefs, jewellery and many earthen objects dating from prehistoric times to the dawn of the Islamic period. The cylinder-seals, personal seals and Luristan bronzes make up some of the highlights of the collection.

Egypt
The Egyptian collection comprises more than 11,000 pieces, offering a wide view of Egyptian art, from its origins to the Christian era. The most striking works are the Lady of Brussels, the relief of Queen Tiyi, and the colossal head of a pharaoh from the Ptolemaic era. A mastaba, mummies and their sarcophagi illustrate the funeral customs of the ancient Egyptians.

Greece
The collection of vases is the highlight of the Greek section. The forms, styles, decorations, and workshops are presented in all their diversity, from the Bronze Age to the Hellenistic period.

Rome
The Roman collections revolve around a few important works, namely remarkable Etruscan mirrors, as well as marble busts from the Imperial period. Many important and impressive remains from Apamea, Syria, including part of the Great Colonnade and outstanding mosaic floors are on view, such as a hunting scene from the palace of the governor of the province of Syria Secunda. The world famous bronze statue of Emperor Septimus Severus is found in the Apamea hall. The Roman collection also includes a large-scale  of the city of Rome during the 4th century AD by the French architect Paul Bigot.

Byzantine and Oriental Christian arts
The Byzantine and Christian arts of the East are represented by icons, an episcopal chair, silks, Coptic textiles and ceramics from both Byzantium and Greece, as well as Eastern Europe, the Near East, Russia, Egypt, and Ethiopia.

Non-European civilisations
This section showcases the important collections of artefacts from Asian countries, such as China, Japan, Korea, Southeast Asia, as well as the Americas (showing pre-Columbian civilisations and contemporary societies), Oceania (particularly Easter Island) and the Islamic world.

Islamic art
The diversity of peoples and cultures that make up the Islamic world is reflected in works from Spain (Al-Andalus), North Africa, the Near and Middle East, and India. These testimonies, among which textiles and ceramics are the best represented artistic disciplines, span from the 8th to the 20th centuries.

Asia
Works from China, Korea, India and Southeast Asia allow visitors to discover the secular and religious world of this vast continent with diverse cultures and religions. Vietnamese ceramics, Tibetan paintings, Khmer sculptures, Laos drums, delicate Chinese jades and an Indonesian puppet theatre are some examples.

Polynesia and Micronesia

The collections devoted to Polynesia and Micronesia bring together archaeological and ethnographic objects evoking daily life, weaving, the work of bark, stone, wood and bone. One of the centerpieces is undoubtedly the colossal sculpture of Pou Hakanononga, the god of tuna, brought back from Easter Island in 1935 by the Belgian training ship Mercator.

America
The museum holds the largest collection of Ancient American artifacts in Europe. Through 4000 years of history, from 2000 BC to the present day, statuettes, painted vases, jewellery revive the Inca, Mayan and Aztec civilisations. The ethnographic collections also make it possible to discover the feathered art of the native people of Amazonia (such as the famous Moctezuma coat ) and the first nations of North America, represented in particular by the impressive totem pole which welcomes visitors who enter these rooms.

European decorative arts
This section is dedicated to the fine arts from the Middle Ages to the 20th century showing sculptures, furniture, ceramics, metals, and glassware. There is an important and large department of textiles including Flemish tapestries, costumes and dress, as well as needle lace and bobbin lace (parts from the royal collection). Horse-drawn vehicles, as well as photographic and cinematographic equipment, are also on display.

The Treasure room and Mosan art
The panorama of industrial arts opens with Mosan masterpieces of goldsmithery, presented in the Treasure room with the atmosphere of a medieval crypt. In the access corridor, stained glass windows and textiles from the same period are exposed.

From the Gothic period to the Baroque period
A circuit around the Gothic cloister then leads visitors from the 13th to the 17th centuries, the golden age of the Southern Netherlands. In addition to sculptures, stained glass, ceramics, silverware, altarpieces and tapestries from the 15th and 16th centuries constitute, by their number and quality, a world famous collection.

From the Baroque period to the 20th century
Works dating from the 17th to the 20th centuries attest to the growing importance of secular art. This is the case with the collection of Antwerp cabinets, the music room and furniture from Liège. The highlight of this set is the reconstruction of the store designed by Victor Horta for Wolfers silversmiths, which serves as a backdrop for a splendid selection of Art Nouveau and Art Deco works. In the Parc du Cinquantenaire, a small pavilion is associated with these collections. Designed by Horta, it houses the bas-relief of the Human Passions, sculpted by Jef Lambeaux.

The rooms by subject
Other rooms group works of art by subject. One of the most important copperware sets preserved is housed in the chapel. Glassware, stained glass, tinware, precision instruments, and European ceramics complete the evolution of the arts of fire. The lace room communicates with that of textiles and costumes. Cinematic and photographic devices as well as horse-drawn vehicles complete this vast panorama. There is also the Heart Museum, a room presenting the collection of the cardiologist Boyadjian and made up of objects referring to the heart in all its forms.

See also

 AutoWorld
 Mundaneum
 History of Brussels
 Culture of Belgium
 Belgium in "the long nineteenth century"

References

Notes

External links

 Royal Museums of Art and History

Museums in Brussels
Archaeological museums in Belgium
Art museums and galleries in Belgium
Asian art museums in Belgium
Cinquantenaire
Decorative arts museums
Egyptological collections
Ethnographic museums in Europe
Museums of ancient Greece
Museums of Ancient Near East in Europe
Museums of ancient Rome
Pre-Columbian art museums